Euphaedra crockeri, or Crocker's forester, is a butterfly in the family Nymphalidae. It is found in Guinea, Sierra Leone, Liberia, Ivory Coast and Ghana. The habitat consists of wetter forests.

Description
Very close to Euphaedra xypete qv.

Subspecies
Euphaedra crockeri crockeri (Guinea, Sierra Leone, Liberia, Ghana)
Euphaedra crockeri umbratilis Hecq, 1987 (Ivory Coast)

References

Butterflies described in 1869
crockeri
Butterflies of Africa
Taxa named by Arthur Gardiner Butler